Paul Holmes is a British freelance television director and lecturer at Napier University in Edinburgh, Scotland.
Holme wrote and directed a short film Sniper 470, starring actors Billy Boyd and Carmen Pieraccini.
Holmes was nominated for a BAFTA for producing the short A Small Deposit, along with director Eleanor Yule. He also produced and directed a short film Going Down.

Holmes previously worked in children's television, directing drama series such as Newcastle-based Byker Grove
He also worked on children's programme Balamory and between 2005-06 Holmes directed several episodes of BBC Scotland's Glasgow-based soap River City.

Filmography

References

External links 

British television directors
Academics of Edinburgh Napier University
Living people
Year of birth missing (living people)